The Filipino Bayanihan (buy-uh-nee-hun) Center in Portland, Oregon is a branch of the National Alliance for Filipino Concerns Mission (NAFCON) created to provide community resources and support for Filipinos primarily focused on assisting Filipinos affected by COVID-19 with health and wellness related resources. Established in June of 2021, the Filipino Bayanihan Center was formed to expand the network of advocates dedicated to support Filipinos living in compromised conditions. The Filipino Bayanihan Center works closely with NAFCON to promote its many agendas. In April of 2020 NAFCON began its Bayanihan Response to COVID-19 to rapidly deploy the newly formed Bayanihan taskforce to deliver resources to Filipinos negatively effected by COVID-19. The Filipino Bayanihan Center is and extension of this campaign. Additionally the Filipino Bayanihan Center operates a cultural community food pantry program with produce provided by Kasama Farms located in Hood River Oregon.

Founders 
Nikki De Leon

Patrick Villaflores

Jamie Lim

History 
As a result of widespread formation of Filipino cultural organizations throughout Oregon and Washington Universities, a group of Filipino community organizers including, Nikki De Leon, traveled to the Philippines immerse themselves in indigenous Filipino culture. Once they returned to Oregon they formed NAFCON and many other community alliances in Portland and Seattle. In June 2021 the Filipino Bayanihan Center in Southeast Portland was established by Nikki De Leon and Patrick Villaflores with support from civic leader and publisher of the Asian Reporter, Jamie Lim, with the primary objective of providing COVID-19 relief to the Filipino community.

Mission and vision 
Uniting the Filipino population in Oregon in a community support structure for marginalized populations with the goal of providing resources and education to Filipinos in the US and in the Philippines.

Mission statement:

"The work of the Center aims to create a space where Filipinos can find a home amongst each other and create opportunities to connect with, and to advocate for, our motherland and fellow kababayan."

Vision statement:

"Together, we envision a future grounded in health, livelihood, and justice for everyday Filipinos."

National Alliance for Filipino Concerns Mission (NAFCON) 
NAFCON is a Filipino advocacy group established in opposition to anti-immigration sentiment after 9/11. It aims to empower Filipinos in the US as well as in the Philippines handling matters such as deportations, workforce discrimination, and health and well-being.

Bayanihan spirit 
Bayanihan (buy-uh-nee-hun) spirit is a tradition of uniting as a community to work towards a common goal. Derived from the word Bayan which means nation, town, or community. Most commonly referred to the custom of volunteering to move family houses, traditionally called Bahay Kubo, by hand to another location.

References 

Wikipedia Student Program